Maximiano Mcwilliam Lunguzi was an Inspector General of Police in Malawi. He was removed from his post by President Bakili Muluzi and reassigned as a diplomat without an explanation in a move that was challenged by the court and ruled unconstitutional.
He was charged with conspiracy to commit murder together with John Tembo, Cecilia Kadzamira but was acquitted.

He was alleged to have been involved in the Mwanza murders, in which three cabinet ministers and an MP were murdered in Mwanza. Lunguzi, John Tembo, Cecilia Kadzamira and police officers McDonald Kalemba and Leston Likawombe were charged with conspiracy to commit murder. They were all acquitted by Judge Mackson Mkandawire.

In 1995, after his retirement, he entered politics and showed signs of wanting to run for Malawi Congress Party president. He died before running for president, in a car crash on July 2nd, 1996. President Bakkili Muluzi launched an investigation into his death due to the suspicious nature of the car accident.

Pop culture
 He is mentioned in the book, And Crocodiles are Hungry at Night by Jack Mapanje, as the Prison Inspector who negotiated between Mapanje and President Banda while Mapanje was in jail.
He is mentioned in the book Discourses of Empire and Commonwealth, by Jack Mapanje.

References

Malawian civil servants
Malawian police officers
Malawian diplomats
Year of birth missing
1996 deaths